The Battle of Orford Ness was a naval battle fought between a southbound Swedish convoy escorted by the Swedish warship Öland and an English squadron of eight ships of the line and a frigate off the coast of Orford Ness on 27 July 1704 (Julian calendar). The English squadron started to follow the Swedish convoy upon sighting it and when they caught up with the Swedes,  demanded a salute due to Psilander being in English waters. The Swedish commander Gustaf von Psilander, under strict orders from his king not to, refused (in order to avoid damaging his nation's honor). A four-hour battle ensued, with the heavily damaged Öland being captured alongside the convoyed merchant ships. The Swedish Board of Admiralty and Board of Trade refused to demand for his release or support Psilander while he was in captivity, but Charles XII was of a different opinion and successfully demanded the release of the warship and crew. Psilander, his crew, and the convoyed ships were later released and returned to Sweden. However, Öland later sank north of Denmark while homebound.

References

Orford Ness (1704)
Orford Ness (1704)
1704 in military history